Sorb apple may refer to several trees, or their fruits, in the genus Sorbus:

Sorbus domestica, the true service tree
Sorbus aucuparia, the rowan
Sorbus torminalis, the wild service tree